The Lucchini SP91 is a sports prototype race car, designed, developed, and built by Italian manufacturer Lucchini Engineering, for sports car racing, conforming to the LMP rules and regulations, in 1991. A total of 3 models were produced.

References

Sports prototypes
Le Mans Prototypes